Patri david is a species of spiders in the family Oonopidae found in the Seychelles. It was first described in 2001 by Saaristo. , it was the only species in the monotypic genus Patri.

References

Oonopidae
Spiders of Africa
Spiders described in 1979